Crowd collapses and crushes are catastrophic incidents that can occur when a body of people becomes dangerously overcrowded. When a body of people reaches or exceeds the density of four to five people per square meter (about 2.5 square feet per person (1.58’ by 1.58’)), the pressure on each individual can cause the crowd to collapse in on itself, or become so densely packed that individuals are crushed and asphyxiated. 

At this density, a crowd can start to act like fluid, sweeping individuals around without their volition. Such incidents are invariably the product of failures of organizations, and most major crowd disasters can be prevented by simple crowd management strategies. Such incidents can occur at large gatherings such as  sporting, commercial, social, and religious events. The critical factor is crowd density rather than crowd size.

Background 
One study has calculated that there were 232 deaths and over 66,000 injuries in the ten years between 1992 and 2002, and it is believed by crowd scientists that such incidents are both vastly under-reported and increasing in frequency. One estimate is that only one in ten crowd injuries occurring in doorbuster sales are reported, while many, if not most, injuries at rock concerts go unreported.

Dynamics 

Even if people are moving quickly, at this density it is possible to avoid obstacles  and the chance of a crowd-related incident is minimal. Even at  the risk is low; however at densities of  the possibilities for individuals to move become limited, while at higher densities individuals become pressed against each other, and can be unable to move of their own volition. At this point a crowd can begin to act like  a fluid, with individuals moved about by the pressure of those around them, and shockwaves can pass through the crowd as pressures within the crowd change. This can be highly dangerous, although in some cases this experience is actively sought, such as at rock concerts or football matches, where the excitement, camaraderie, and literally 'going with the flow' is an essential part of the experience, and activities like dancing and moshing are common. The dangers inherent in these conditions is that the crowd will collapse in on itself, or become so densely packed that individuals are crushed and asphyxiated.

Crowd collapses 
A crowd collapse occurs when a crowd is so dense that each individual is touching others all around, and is to an extent supported by those around. This can occur whether the crowd is moving or stationary. If a person then falls, the support to those around is lost, while the pressure from those further  out remains, causing people to fall into the void. This process is then repeated, causing a bigger void, and will progress until the pressure eases; meanwhile, those who have fallen are at risk of being smothered by the weight of bodies on top, or being trampled as the crowd is swept over them.
An example of a progressive crowd collapse was the 2015 Mina stampede in Mecca, Saudi Arabia during the Hajj when over 2,400 people were reported to have died.

Crowd crushes 
At even higher densities (up to ) a crowd can become so packed that people are crushed together to such an extent they can no longer breathe, and are asphyxiated. Such crowd crushes can occur when a moving crowd is funnelled into a smaller and smaller space, or when it meets an obstacle (such as a dead end, or a locked door), or when an already densely packed crowd has an influx of people, causing a pressure wave toward those at the front of the crowd. In this situation those entering may be unaware of the effect on those in front, and continue to press in.
Examples of crushes are the Hillsborough disaster in Sheffield, South Yorkshire, England in 1989 and the Love Parade disaster in Duisburg, North Rhine-Westphalia, Germany in 2010.

Crowd "stampedes" 

The term stampede is usually used in reference to animals that are fleeing a threat. Stampede events that involve humans are extremely rare and are unlikely to be fatal. According to Keith Still, professor of crowd science at Manchester Metropolitan University, "If you look at the analysis, I’ve not seen any instances of the cause of mass fatalities being a stampede. People don’t die because they panic. They panic because they are dying".  Paul Torrens, a professor at the Center for Geospatial Information Science at the University of Maryland, remarks that "the idea of the hysterical mass is a myth".

Causes of death 
In crowd collapse and crush incidents the most common cause of death is asphyxiation, caused either by vertical stacking, as people fall on top of one another, or by horizontal stacking, where people are crushed together or against an unyielding barrier. Victims can also exhibit fractures due to pressure, or trampling injuries, when a crowd has swept over them where they have lain.

Prevention

It is believed that most major crowd disasters can be prevented by simple crowd management strategies. Crushes can be prevented by organization and traffic control, such as barriers. On the other hand, barriers in some cases may funnel the crowd toward an already-packed area, such as in the Hillsborough disaster. Hence barriers can be a solution in preventing or a key factor in causing a crush. One problem is lack of feedback from people being crushed to the crowd pressing behind—feedback can instead be provided by police, organizers, or other observers, particularly raised observers, such as on platforms or horseback, who can survey the crowd and use loudspeakers to communicate and direct a crowd. In some cases it may be possible to take simple measures such as spreading movements out over time.

A factor that may contribute to a crush is inexperienced security officers who assume that people's behaviour in a dense crowd is voluntary and dangerous, and start applying force or preventing people from moving in certain directions. In the 1989 Hillsborough disaster, some police and stewards were so concerned with what they saw as possible hooliganism that they took actions that actually made matters worse.

There is risk of a crush when crowd density exceeds about four people per square meter. For a person in a crowd a signal of danger, and a warning to get out of the crowd if possible, is the sensation of being touched on all four sides. A later, more serious, warning is when one feels shock waves travelling through the crowd, due to people at the back pushing forward against people at the front with nowhere to go. Keith Still of the Fire Safety Engineering Group, University of Greenwich, said "Be aware of your surroundings. Look ahead. Listen to the crowd noise. If you start finding yourself in a crowd surge, wait for the surge to come, go with it, and move sideways. Keep moving with it and sideways, with it and sideways." Other recommendations include trying to remain upright, and keeping away from walls and other obstructions if possible.

After the 1883 crush known as the Victoria Hall disaster in Sunderland, England which killed 183 children, a law was passed in England which required all public entertainment venues to be equipped with doors that open outwards—for example, using crash bar latches that open when pushed. Crash bars are required by various building codes.

See also
 List of fatal crowd crushes
:Category:Crowd collapses and crushes

References

Sources

External links 
 How to stay safe at a crowded concert or music festival: CNN
 Fire Safety Engineering Group
 Interview with Paul Wertheimer (Crowd-safety expert) at Insider.com
 "World's worst stampedes" – China Daily

Hazards
Man-made disasters
+